Kostis Gontikas or Gondikas (Greek: Κωστής Γόντικας, born 1934 in Athens, Greece) is a Greek politician.  He was born in 1934 in Athens and was the son of Dimitrios Gontikas, a politician and president of the Greek parliament.  He later studied at the Athens College and law at the University of Athens.  He continued his studies at the University of Luxembourg.  He was elected in 1974 and 1978 as MP of the Elis Prefecture, and in 1981 as a Member of the European Parliament (MEP), with the New Democracy Party.

He is married and has three children.

References

The first version of the article is translated and is based from the equivalent article at the Greek Wikipedia (el:Main Page)

1934 births
Living people
Politicians from Athens
National and Kapodistrian University of Athens alumni
Greek MPs 1974–1977
Greek MPs 1977–1981
MEPs for Greece 1981–1984
New Democracy (Greece) MEPs